Metagaming is a term used in role-playing games, which describes a player's use of real-life knowledge concerning the state of the game to determine their character's actions, when said character has no relevant knowledge or awareness under the circumstances. This can refer to plot information in the game such as secrets or events occurring away from the character, as well as facets of the game's mechanics such as abstract statistics or the precise limits of abilities. Metagaming is an example of "breaking character", as the character is making decisions based on information they could not know and thus would not make in reality. 

Metagaming is considered unsporting or cheating in a competitive gaming context, and is generally poorly received as it subverts the emphasis of accurate character depiction based on in-game experiences and back-story that defines role-playing games. Outside of role-playing, metagaming simply refers to players using knowledge or understanding of external factors (such as community trends or coincidental events) to gain an advantage in competition.

Concept
More broadly, metagaming can refer any or all aspects of play that occur outside of a given game's fictional setting. This most prominently includes any discussion among players and/or the game's master about the game's events and contents. The practice metagaming is often frowned upon in many role-playing communities, as it upsets the suspension of disbelief and affects game balance. However, some narrativist indie role-playing games deliberately support metagaming and encourage shared storytelling among players. It can be contrasted with live action roleplaying games with a more cinematic style, where the use of metagame references to specific books and films, either before the game or during play, prompts the players as to the atmosphere the organisers are aiming to create.

Examples
Gathering knowledge:
 Any action that is based upon the real-life knowledge that one is playing a game.
 Gaining knowledge from Out-Of-Character (such as pre-reading adventure guides or watching others play through the same game or pre-prepared campaign).
 Using in-world knowledge from a previously played or dead character.
 In split-screen games, using another player's viewpoint to gather information that one's own character does not know and could not access.

Bending the rules:
 Adjusting a character's actions based on foreknowledge of the long-term intentions of the gamemaster.
 Basing a character's decision on knowledge of the game's mechanics to gain an advantage, when the resulting action goes against that character's personality, history or motives.
 As a form of powergaming during character creation, when a player takes flaws or liabilities that they know the gamemaster is unlikely to fully exploit, thereby acquiring extra creation options without paying a corresponding penalty.

Altering behaviors:
 Using certain types of attack or defense based on the strengths and weaknesses of an opponent of which the player's character has no knowledge.
 Acting on any knowledge that the character does not know and could not learn - for example, applying real-life chemistry to create gunpowder in a pre-firearms setting, without said character having any foreknowledge or interest in chemistry or any precedence for its development.
 Adjusting a character's behavior towards other player characters based on real-life relationships with other players. This extends to and includes attempts to engender friendships or relationships, and manipulate those of others, via favoritism in-game.
 Deciding on a character's course of action based on how the game's abstract mechanics will affect the outcome.
 Assuming that something that appears to be wrong or unlikely in the game world is a mistake of the game's master rather than something that could be investigated. (There are incidences where a game's master's depiction of the world is genuinely at fault, causing players to gain knowledge their characters should not know - however, it is incumbent on players to not utilize that knowledge for their character's future decisions.)
 Assuming that if an item (such as a chest, desk, or book-case) is mentioned by the gamemaster during the initial description of an area, it must have some relevance to the storyline, and immediately searching or examining it. (While ignoring other furnishings or objects that are most likely there as well.)

See also
 Fourth wall
 Min-maxing
 Powergaming
 Twinking

Notes

References

External links
 The Last Dark Art: Exploring the Gaming Aesthetic – RPGnet article on metagaming

Metafictional techniques
Role-playing game terminology